Michael Schüler (born 22 July 1997) is a German footballer who plays as a defender for TSV Steinbach Haiger.

Career
Schüler made his professional debut for Carl Zeiss Jena in the 3. Liga on 12 November 2018, coming on as a substitute in the 70th minute for Fabien Tchenkoua in the 3–2 away win against Wehen Wiesbaden.

References

External links
 Profile at DFB.de
 Profile at kicker.de
 

1997 births
Living people
People from Adenau
Footballers from Rhineland-Palatinate
German footballers
Association football defenders
1. FC Köln II players
TuS Koblenz players
FC Carl Zeiss Jena players
TSV Steinbach Haiger players
3. Liga players
Regionalliga players